Belknap is an unincorporated community in Davis County, in the U.S. state of Iowa.

History
The community's population was 150 in 1890, 146 in 1900, and 115 in 1920.

References

Unincorporated communities in Davis County, Iowa
Unincorporated communities in Iowa